An Internet meme, commonly known simply as a meme, is a cultural item (such as an idea, behaviour, or style) that is spread via the Internet, often through social media platforms. Inspired by the concept of memes proposed by Richard Dawkins in 1972, Internet memes can take various forms, such as images, videos, GIFs, and various other viral sensations. Characteristics of memes include their susceptibility to parody, their use of intertextuality, their propagation in a viral pattern, and their evolution over time.

The term "Internet meme" was formally proposed by Mike Godwin in 1993, with early memes including images and GIFs spread via messageboards, Usenet groups, and email. With the rise of social media platforms such as YouTube, Twitter, and Facebook, memes have become more diverse and can spread quickly. More recent genres include "dank" and surrealist memes, as well as short-form videos such as those uploaded on Vine  and TikTok.

Memes are considered an important part of Internet culture. They appear in a range of contexts (such as marketing, finance, politics, social movements, religion, and healthcare), and use of media from various sources can sometimes lead to issues with copyright.

Characteristics 
Internet memes sprout from the original concept of memes as an element of culture passed on from person to person; for the former, this spread occurs through online mediums such as social media.  Though the terms are related, Internet memes differ in that they are often short-lasting fads, while traditional memes have their success determined by longevity. Internet memes are also seen as less conceptually abstract compared to their traditional counterpart. There is no single format that memes must follow, and they can have various purposes. For example, they often serve as simply light entertainment, but can also be powerful tools for self-expression, connection, social influence, and political subversion.

Two central attributes of Internet memes are creative reproduction and intertextuality. The former refers to the tendency of a popular meme to become subject to parody and imitation, which may occur by mimicry or remix. Mimicry refers to reproduction of a meme in a different setting to the original, for example imitation of the "Charlie Bit My Finger" viral video by various individuals. Remix uses the original material of the meme, but alters it in some way using technology-based manipulation (such as Photoshop).

Intertextuality may be demonstrated through memes that combine different subjects or aspects of culture. For example, a meme may combine United States politician Mitt Romney's assertion of the phrase "binders full of women" from a 2012 US presidential debate with the Korean pop song "Gangnam Style" by overlaying the text "my binders full of women exploded" onto a frame from Psy's music video where paper blows around him. This gives new meaning to the scene from the music video and blends political and cultural aspects of two different nations.

Memes can involve in-jokes within online communities, which communicate exclusive cultural knowledge unbeknown to general users; through this, a collective group identity can be built. Other memes, in contrast, have broader cultural relevance and can be understood even by those outside the subculture one would associate with the meme.

A study by Michele Knobel and Colin Lankshear explored three characteristics of successful memes identified by Richard Dawkins (fidelity, fecundity, and longevity) in relation to Internet memes. It was found that the fidelity of internet memes was better understood as replicability, as memes, though preserving their essence, are often not transmitted entirely "intact" (due to remixing of some sort). Fecundity was postulated to be determined by three main characteristics: humour (e.g. the comically translated video game line "All your base are belong to us"), intertextuality (e.g. the various pop culture-referencing renditions of the Star Wars Kid viral video), and anomalous juxtaposition (e.g. the Bert is Evil phenomenon). Lastly, a meme's longevity was found to be sustained by the Internet itself.

Evolution and propagation 

Internet memes may stay the same or evolve over time. They can "mutate" in their meaning but maintain their structure, or vice versa, such mutation occurring by chance or by deliberate means such as parody. A study by Miltner explored the LOLcats meme and its evolution over time from an in-joke within computer and gaming communities on 4chan to a source of emotional support and humour for a broader audience. The shift of the meme to mainstream use caused it to become unfashionable among the original creators. Miltner explained "as content passes through various communities, it is interpreted in new ways and takes on new connotations; these are usually specific to the needs and desires of that community, and quite often divorced from the original intent of the creator". Often, the modifications to a meme can turn it into a phenomenon that transgresses social and cultural boundaries.

Memes propagate in a viral pattern, "infecting" individuals in a pattern reminiscent of the SIR model for spread of disease. Once a meme has been propagated to enough people, continued spread is inevitable. A study by Coscia reached a set of conclusions concerning the success of a meme's propagation and its longevity. It found that while Internet memes compete for viewer attention, resulting in shorter lifespan, they can also collaborate with each other to achieve greater survival. Also, paradoxically, a meme that experiences a popularity peak significantly higher than average is not expected to survive unless it is unique, whereas a meme with no such peak continues to be used with other memes and thus has greater survivability. Writing for The Washington Post in 2013, Dominic Basulto asserted that with the growth of the Internet and the exploitation of memes by the marketing and advertising industries, memes have come to lose their initial worth as valuable cultural snippets intended to last for generations, and transmit banal rather than intelligent ideas.

History

Origins and early memes 

The word meme was coined by Richard Dawkins in his 1976 book The Selfish Gene as an attempt to explain how aspects of culture replicate, mutate, and evolve (memetics). Emoticons are among the earliest examples of internet memes, specifically the smiley emoticon ":-)" introduced by Scott Fahlman in 1982. The concept of the Internet meme was formally proposed by Mike Godwin in the June 1993 issue of Wired. In 2013, Dawkins characterized an Internet meme as being a meme deliberately altered by human creativity—distinguished from biological genes and his own pre-Internet concept of a meme, which involved mutation by random change and spreading through accurate replication as in Darwinian selection. Dawkins explained that Internet memes are thus a "hijacking of the original idea", evolving the very concept of a meme in this new direction. Furthermore, Internet memes carry an additional property that ordinary memes do not: internet memes leave a footprint in the media through which they propagate (for example, social networks) that renders them traceable and analyzable.

Internet memes grew as a concept in the mid-late 1990s; examples from this period include the Dancing Baby and Hampster Dance. Memes of this time were primarily spread via messageboards, Usenet groups, and email, and generally lasted for a longer time than modern memes. As the Internet evolved, so did memes. Lolcats originated from imageboard website 4chan (such as lolcats), becoming the prototype of the "image macro" format (an image overlaid by large text). Other early forms of image-based memes included demotivators (parodized motivational posters), photoshopped images, and comics (such as rage comics). After the release of YouTube in 2005, video-based memes such as rickrolling and viral videos such as "Gangnam Style" and the Harlem shake emerged. The appearance of social media websites such as Twitter, Facebook, and Instagram, provided additional vessels for the spread of memes, particularly reaction GIFs, and the creation of meme-generating websites made their production more accessible.

Modern memes 
"Dank memes" are a more recent phenomenon, referring to deliberately zany or odd memes with features such as oversaturated colours, compression artifacts, crude humour, and overly loud sounds (termed "ear rape"). The term "dank", which refers to cold, damp places, has been adapted as a way to describe memes as "new" or "cool". The term may also be used to describe memes that have become overused and stale to the point of paradoxically becoming humorous again. The phenomenon of dank memes sprouted a subculture called the "meme market", satirising Wall Street and applying the associated jargon (such as "stocks") to internet memes. Originally started on Reddit as /r/MemeEconomy, users jokingly "buy" or "sell" shares in a meme reflecting opinion on its potential popularity.

"Deep-fried" memes refer to those that have been distorted and run through several filters and/or layers of lossy compression. An example of these is the "E" meme, a picture of YouTuber Markiplier photoshopped onto Lord Farquaad from the film Shrek, photoshopped into a scene from businessman Mark Zuckerberg's hearing in Congress.
Elizabeth Bruenig of the Washington Post described this as a "digital update to the surreal and absurd genres of art and literature that characterized the tumultuous early 20th century".

Many modern memes make use of humorously absurd and even surrealist themes. Examples of the former include "they did surgery on a grape", a video depicting a Da Vinci Surgical System performing test surgery on a grape, and the "moth meme", a close-up picture of a moth with captions humorously conveying the insect's love of lamps. Surreal memes incorporate layers of irony to make them unique and nonsensical, often as a means of escapism from mainstream meme culture.

After the success of the application Vine, a format of memes emerged in the form of short videos and scripted sketches. An example is the "What's Nine Plus Ten" meme, a Vine video depicting a child humorously providing the incorrect answer to a maths problem. After the shutdown of Vine in 2016, the de facto replacement became Chinese social network TikTok, which similarly utilises the short video format. The platform has become immensely popular, and is the source of memes such as the "Renegade" dance.

By context

Marketing 
The practice of using memes to market products or services has been termed "memetic marketing". Internet memes allow brands to circumvent the conception of advertisements as irksome, making them less overt and more tailored to the likes of their target audience. Marketing personnel may choose to utilise an existing meme, or create a new meme from scratch. Fashion house Gucci employed the former strategy, launching a series of Instagram ads that reimagined popular memes featuring its watch collection. The image macro "The Most Interesting Man in the World" is an example of the latter, a meme generated from an advertising campaign for the Dos Equis beer brand. Products may also gain popularity through internet memes without intention by the producer themselves; for instance, the film Snakes on a Plane became a cult classic after creation of the website SnakesOnABlog.com by law student Brian Finkelstein.

Use of memes by brands, while often advantageous, has been subject to criticism for seemingly forced, unoriginal, or unfunny usage of memes, which can negatively impact a brand's image. For example, the fast food company Wendy's began a social media-based approach to marketing that was initially met with success (resulting in an almost 50% profit growth that year), but received criticism after sharing a controversial Pepe meme that was negatively perceived by consumers.

Finance 

Meme stocks are a phenomenon where stock values for a company rise significantly in a short period due to a surge in interest online and subsequent buying by investors. Video game retailer GameStop is recognised as the first meme stock. /r/WallStreetBets, a subreddit where participants discuss stock trading, and Robinhood Markets, a financial services company, became notable in 2021 for their involvement in the popularisation of meme stocks.

Politics 

Internet memes are a medium for fast communication to large online audiences, which has led to their use by those seeking to express a political opinion or actively campaign for (or against) a political entity. In some ways, they can be seen as a modern form of the political cartoon, offering a way to democratize political commentary.

Among the earliest political memes were those arising from the viral Dean scream, an excerpt from a speech delivered by Vermont governor Howard Dean. Over time, Internet memes have become an increasingly important element in political campaigns, as online communities contribute to broader discourse through the use of memes. For example, Ted Cruz's 2016 Republican presidential bid was damaged by Internet memes that speculated he was the Zodiac Killer.

Research has shown the use of memes during elections has a role to play in informing the public on political themes. A study explored this in relation to the 2017 UK general election, and concluded that memes acted as a widely shared conduit for basic political information to audiences who would usually not seek it out. They also found that memes may play some role in increasing voter turnout.

Some political campaigns have begun to explicitly taken advantage of the increasing influence of memes; as part of the 2020 US presidential campaign, Michael Bloomberg sponsored a number of Instagram accounts (with over 60 million followers collectively) to post memes related to the Bloomberg campaign. The campaign was faulted for treating memes as a commodity that can be bought.

Beyond their use in elections, Internet memes can become symbols for various political ideologies. A salient example is Pepe the Frog, which has been used as a symbol for the alt-right political movement, as well as for pro-democracy ideologies in the 2019–2020 Hong Kong protests.

Social movements 
Internet memes can be powerful tools in social movements, constructing collective identity and providing platform for discourse. During the 2010 It Gets Better Project for LGBTQ+ empowerment, memes were used to uplift LGBTQ+ youth while negotiating the community's collective identity. In 2014, the viral Ice Bucket Challenge raised money and awareness for amyotrophic lateral sclerosis (ALS). Furthermore, internet memes proved an important medium in the discourse surrounding the Occupy Wall Street (OWS) movement.

Religion 
Internet memes have also been used in the context of religion. They create a participatory culture that enable individuals to collectively make meaning of religious beliefs, reflecting a form of lived religion. Gabrielle et al. identified six common genres of religious memes: non-religious image macros with religious themes, image macros featuring religious figures, memes reacting to religion-related news, memes deifying non-religious figures such as celebrities, spoofs of religious images, and video-based memes.

Healthcare 
Social media platforms can increase the speed of dissemination of evidence-based health practices. A study by Reynolds and Boyd found the majority of participants (who were healthcare staff) felt that memes could be an appropriate means of improving healthcare worker's knowledge of and compliance with infection prevention practices. Internet memes were also used in Nigeria to raise awareness of the COVID-19 pandemic, with healthcare professionals using the medium to disseminate information on the virus and its vaccine.

Copyright 
Since many memes are derived from pre-existing works, it has been contended that memes violate the copyright of the original authors. However, some view memes as falling under the ambit of fair use. This dilemma has caused conflict between meme producers and copyright owners, for example Getty Images' demand for payment from the blog Get Digital for publishing the "Socially Awkward Penguin" meme without permission.

United States 
Under United States copyright law, copyright protection subsists in “original works of authorship fixed in any tangible medium of expression, now known or later developed, from which they can be perceived, reproduced, or otherwise communicated, either directly or with the aid of a machine or device". It is disputed whether the use of memes constitutes copyright infringement. Fair use is a defence under U.S. copyright law which protects work made using other copyrighted works. Section 107 of the 1976 Copyright Act outlines four factors for analysis of fair use:

 The purpose and character of the use,
 The nature of the copyrighted work,
 The amount and substantiality of the portion used, and
 The effect of the use upon the potential market for or value of the copyrighted work.

The first factor implies the secondary use of a copyrighted work should be "transformative" (that is, giving novel meaning or expression to the original work); many memes fulfil this criteria, placing pieces of media in a new context to serve a different purpose to that of the original author. The second factor favours copied works drawing from factual sources, which may be problematic for memes derived from fictional works (such as films). Many of these memes, however, only use small portions of such works (such as still images), favouring an argument of fair use per the third factor. With regards to the fourth factor, most memes are non-commercial in nature and thus would not have adverse effects on the potential market for the copyright work. Given these factors, and the overall reliance of memes on appropriation of other sources, it has been argued that they deserve protection from copyright infringement suits.

NFTs 
Some individuals who are subjects of memes (and thus the copyright holders) have made money through sale of NFTs in auctions. Ben Lashes, a manager of numerous memes, stated their sales as NFTs made over US$2 million and established memes as serious forms of art. One example is the "Disaster Girl", based on a photo of Zoe Roth at age 4 taken in Mebane, North Carolina in January 2005. After this photo became famous and was used hundreds of times without permission, Roth decided to sell the original copy as an NFT for US$500,000, with agreement for a further 10 per cent share of any future sales.

See also 

 List of Internet phenomena
 Remix culture

References

Further reading 
 
 
 Wiggins, Bradley E. (September 22, 2014). How the Russia-Ukraine crisis became a magnet for memes. The Conversation. Theconversation.com

External links

 
1990s neologisms